Benjamin Hutchinson Clover (December 22, 1837 – December 30, 1899) was a U.S. Representative from Kansas.

Born near Jefferson, Ohio, Clover attended the common schools. He moved to Kansas in 1871 and settled in Cambridge. He engaged in agricultural pursuits. He served as member of the board of school commissioners 1873-1888. He was twice president of the Kansas State Farmers' Alliance and Industrial Union and twice vice president of the national organization of that order.

Clover was elected as a Populist to the Fifty-second Congress (March 4, 1891 – March 3, 1893). He was not a candidate for renomination in 1892. He resumed agricultural pursuits. He returned to Douglass, Kansas, where he committed suicide on December 30, 1899. He is interred in Douglass Cemetery.

Notes

References

1837 births
1899 deaths
People from Jefferson, Ohio
Kansas Populists
People's Party members of the United States House of Representatives from Kansas
Farmers from Kansas
19th-century American politicians
People from Douglass, Kansas
Suicides in Kansas
Members of the United States House of Representatives from Kansas